Johannes Frederik Hulk Sr. (9 January 1829 – 12 June 1911) was a Dutch painter, draftsman, photographer, and owner of a paint supplies store.

Life and work 
Hulk was born in Amsterdam in 1829. He was the youngest son of the merchant Hendrik Hulk and his English wife Mary Burroughs.  He received painting lessons from his older brother Abraham and from Kasparus Karsen.  As a painter he mainly painted landscapes, seascapes, cities, villages, and harbors.  He gave painting lessons to his son Johannes Frederik "John" Hulk Jr., and to Bernard de Hoog, Bertha Müller, and Elias Stark.  He was a member of the artists' society Arti et Amicitiae in Amsterdam.

Hulk was not only a painter, but also a draftsman and owned a painting and drawing supplies store, De Rembrandt ("The Rembrandt"), on the Rokin in Amsterdam.  After the advent of photography, he trained himself in this new discipline.  Together with his partner, Pieter Vlaander, he ran a photographic studio called Rembrandt, also on the Rokin.  They worked together as the photographic studio Hulk & Vlaander until 1867. They also opened a studio on the Geldersekade in Rotterdam.

Hulk lived and worked most of his life in Amsterdam and in the nearby Sloten.  After 1901 he lived successively in Vreeland, Abcoude and Haarlem.  Hulk was married twice.  From his first marriage to Hermine Cornelie Auguste Mulder, he had a daughter Betsy (1853–1903) and a son John. After the death of his first wife in 1866, he married his housekeeper Margaritha Bakker in 1868 in Muiden.  He died in 1911 in Haarlem.  He is buried at the family cemetery in Muiderberg.

Gallery

Exhibitions 
Hulk held exhibitions of his photographic work at the Paleis voon Volksvlijt ("Palace of Industry") in Amsterdam in 1865, and in the Prentenkabinet ("Print Room") at the University of Leiden.

References 

 Biographical data about Johannes Frederik Hulk Sr. on the website of the Netherlands Institute for Art History
Allgemeines Künstlerlexikon ("Artists of the world"): Hulk, J. F.
Leijerzapf, Ingeborg Th. Johannes Frederik Hulk sr.
Obituary of J.F. Hulk. Het nieuws van den dag ("The news of the day"), 15 June 1911

1829 births
1911 deaths
19th-century Dutch photographers
19th-century Dutch painters
20th-century Dutch painters
Painters from Amsterdam
Dutch draughtsmen
Dutch landscape painters
Dutch male painters
19th-century Dutch male artists
20th-century Dutch male artists